Grundelbach is a river of Baden-Württemberg and Hesse, Germany. It passes through Gorxheimertal and flows into the Weschnitz in Weinheim.

See also
List of rivers of Baden-Württemberg
List of rivers of Hesse

References

Rivers of Hesse
Rivers of Baden-Württemberg
Rivers of Germany